The Georgia Department of Education (GaDOE) is an American agency that governs public education in the state of Georgia. The department manages funding and testing for local educational agencies accountable for student achievement. The department is managed by the State Superintendent of Schools, a publicly elected position currently held by Richard Woods (since 2015). Former Superintendents of the department have included Linda Schrenko, Kathy Cox, William Bradley Bryant, John Barge, and Charles McDaniel; the first superintendent was John Randolph Lewis, in 1871.

The department is headquartered in the 2054 Twin Towers East building at 205 Jesse Hill Jr. Drive SE at Martin Luther King Jr. Drive in Downtown Atlanta.

Organization
The following five offices comprise the Georgia Department of Education: the Office of Standards, Instruction and Assessment, the Office of Finance and Business Operations, the Office of Policy and External Affairs, the Office of Education Support and Improvement, and the Office of Technology Services.

Office of Standards, Instruction and Assessment
The Office of Standards, Instructions and Assessment is made up of three Divisions: the Division of Standards Based Learning, which works to provide learning materials and instruction to assist teachers in making sure their students are prepared for graduation and beyond, the Division of Innovative Instruction, which provides educational programs and material for students, and the Division of Assessment and Accountability, which assesses student achievements and provides data to teachers and schools in order to better learn from their strengths and weaknesses.

Office of Finance and Business Operations
The Office of Finance and Business Operations has seven divisions: Account Services, Budget Services, Facility Services, Financial Review, Internal Support, Pupil Transportation and School Nutrition. For the most part these divisions see to the financial needs of the Department of Education and the schools in Georgia. However, the Pupil Transportation and School Nutrition divisions also work to interpret of laws and regulations and provide leadership and training assistance.

Office of Policy and External Affairs
The Office of Policy and External Affairs maintains divisions which deal with charter schools, communication, human resources, policy and state schools.

Office of Education Support and Improvement
Several divisions make up the Office of Education Support and Improvement. Learning Support provides services to schools, teachers and students. Migrant Education works with eligible children in Georgia. School Improvement helps schools by putting together a "statewide system" of tools and resources.

Office of Technology Services
The Office of Technology Services is split into two divisions: the Instructional Technology division, which integrates technology into the classroom and the Information Technology division, which builds infrastructures so information can be given to decision makers in the state.

State exams
The State of Georgia requires students to take several state tests: the Criterion-Referenced Competency Tests, End of Course Tests, Georgia High School Graduation Test, Georgia Alternate Assessment, and the Georgia Writings Assessments.

Rulings 
In 2021 the Department of Education banned teaching that "indoctrinates" students about racism.

References

External links

 Georgia Department of Education

Department of Education
State departments of education of the United States
Education
1870 establishments in Georgia (U.S. state)